Vinodhaya Sitham is a 2021 Indian Tamil-language fantasy comedy drama film directed by Samuthirakani and produced by Abirami Media Works. The film stars Thambi Ramaiah and Samuthirakani. It was released on 13 October 2021 on ZEE5, and received critical acclaim.

Plot 
Parasuram is an assistant general manager in an MNC specialising in Electronics, in Chennai, with desire of retiring as general manager. He is a dominating individual who puts his own interests ahead of others, including that of his own family, comprising his wife Easwari, daughters Veena and Gayathri, and son Arun, who is working in the United States. Once while returning by road from Coimbatore, Parasuram meets with an accident and dies. When he wakes up, he finds himself in a strange dark place, where a gentleman approaches him and introduces himself as Time. Time informs Parasuram that his time at Earth is over. 

On hearing this, Parasuram begs him that his company and family depend on his work for everything. He asks Time to send him back so that he can put his family and company on a stabler condition, before leaving the world. Time agrees but gives him only three months time, based on secrecy about this agreement and on the condition that he is always with him. Thus, Parasuram survives the accident and returns home, with Time in tow.

Over the course of the next three months, Parasuram faces many hurdles in his personal life, all witnessed by Time. He is bypassed in favour of Madhanagopal, a young IIM graduate for the post of General Manager, causing him to resign from his job in protest and leaves the office. Within minutes, he receives news that Easwari fell unconscious and was taken to hospital. There he finds Easwari has early stages of Parkinson's disease and is recommended to take her to US for further treatment. Time also make him realize that his savings will run out soon. Parasuram resumes his job. Parasuram's elder daughter Veena, for whom he was finalising an alliance with his best friend Krishnamoorthy's son, disagrees for the marriage. Before his eyes, she leaves home with her boyfriend. 

Within minutes, Arun returns home, and tells that he lost his job. Parasuram further finds out that Arun is in a live-in relationship with an Indian American girl named Andrea, who introduces herself as Mahalakshmi. Arun berates his father for always interfering in his life decisions and gives him an ultimatum: to either accept his love life or to expel him entirely. Due to Veena's decision, the next morning Parasuram fixes the marriage between Krishnamoorthy's son and his youngest daughter Gayathri, who accepts in order to save her father's reputation, despite wanting to study abroad.

Weeks later, Parasuram is insulted in the board meeting, for being absent during a discussion. He rants about it to Time in a bar and is overheard by his MD. Parasuram's idea works and the company makes higher profit. The MD moves to become Chairman and Parasuram becomes the Managing Director, thus reaching higher than his ambition. He brings Easwari home and is shocked that Easwari is aware about Veena's and Arun's relationships and manages to convince Parasuram to accept them, which he does on realising (with Time's help) that Krishnamoorthy's son had a relationship with another woman, who was pregnant with their child, and he and Krishnamoorthy were forcing her to undergo an abortion. He then cancels Gayathri's wedding and allows her to study further. He carries out his responsibilities with humility and is no longer dominating as before. He also spends more time with his family and enjoys with them. He pays ahead in full for Gayathri's higher study in Switzerland.

10 days before the end of the three month period, Parasuram, realising that his death is near, pledges his organs. The same night Parasuram confesses that he had cheated two others in the past in the name of job and love, and completely regrets what he had done. Time reveals that Madhanagopal was the son of Venugopal, whom Parasuram cheated 30 years ago to get the job in an interview. Time says that Venugopal got the better life which was actually planned for Parasuram, and died happily. That was also one of the reason why Madhanagopal superseded him to being General manager.

Time pinpoints that Parasuram ditched his poor lover Sathya 25 years ago, because he got a better offer of marrying Easwari who came with more money. Sathya attempted suicide, but survived, and progressed in life. She had moved ahead in life, reached higher places and is working as Governor of Meghalaya. Time makes a call to her so that Parasuram may apologise. But Satya cuts the call after hearing Parasuram's voice. Parasuram cries out that he thought everything was his accomplishment, while it was not solely because of his effort. Time realises that Parasuram's reformation is genuine and offers to accompany him to heaven, which he accepts wholeheartedly. While he walks with Time to heaven, it is shown in parallel that he has died in his sleep.

During the credits, a politician comes across Time during a political rally. When the politician confronts Time for wearing a black shirt when all others are wearing white, Time informs him that his time is over. The screen then cuts to black.

Cast 

 Thambi Ramaiah as Parasuram
 Samuthirakani as God of Time
 Sriranjini as Eswari
 Deepak Dinkar as Arun
 Sheriina as Andrea (Mahalakshmi)
 Sanchita Shetty as Veena
 Yuvasri Lakshmi as Gayathri
 Hari Krishnan as Veena's husband
 Jayaprakash as Parasuram’s MD
 Munishkanth as Krishnamoorthy
 Namo Narayana as a MLA
 Balaji Mohan as a doctor

Music 
The score was composed by C. Sathya and the film did not have any songs.

Remake
As of February 2023, a Telugu remake was announced with Pawan Kalyan and Sai Dharam Tej enacting Samuthirakani and Thambi Ramaiah's roles, respectively. Samuthirakani is also directing the remake, while it is being produced by T. G. Vishwa Prasad and Vivek Kuchibotla, under People Media Factory.

Reception 

Sify gave a rating of 3 out of 5 and wrote, "Vinodhaya Sitham is a neat feel-good fantasy drama that is worth a watch!". Cinema Express gave a rating of 3 out of 5 and wrote, "Through Vinodhaya Sitham, Samuthirakani and Co tell us that although there is very little we can do, it shouldn’t stop us from being... well, nice people. As Albus Dumbledore says in Harry Potter, 'For the well-organised mind, death is but the next great adventure.' Did I ever think I’d be using a Harry Potter quote to sum up a Samuthirakani film? Well... that’s one Vinodhaya Sitham indeed." Behindwoods gave a rating of 2.5 out of 5 and wrote, "Vinodhaya Sitham engages well to an extent, and can be watched for the unique message it carries." Suganth of The Times of India gave a rating of 3 out of 5 and wrote, "Thambi Ramaiah anchors [the film] with a performance that is affecting at times and over-the-top often, but he manages to make us care about Parasuraman's fate. The supporting cast does what is expected of them, but the treatment of this material feels more TV serial-ish. The insistent background score, by C Sathya, which tries to feed us every emotion rather than make us experience them on our own, only fuels this feeling further."

References

External links 
 

2020s Tamil-language films
2021 drama films
2021 fantasy films
Films directed by Samuthirakani
Indian fantasy drama films
ZEE5 original films